The Austin Open was a golf tournament on the Nike Tour. It ran from 1997 to 1998 and was played at The Hills Country Club in Austin, Texas.

Eric Booker won the inaugural event that was rain-shortened to 36 holes. Michael Allen won the second and final event.

Winners

See also
Austin Civitan Open, a 1962 LPGA Tour event

Notes

References

Former Korn Ferry Tour events
Golf in Texas
Sports in Austin, Texas
Recurring sporting events established in 1997
Recurring sporting events disestablished in 1998
1997 establishments in Texas
1998 disestablishments in Texas